Parndorf is a town in the district of Neusiedl am See in the Austrian state of Burgenland. Its original ancient name Perun is derived from the Slavic deity Perun.

Population

References

Cities and towns in Neusiedl am See District